Horse pulling is a draft horse competition where horses in harness, usually one or two animals, pull a stone-boat or weighted sled and the winner is the team or animal that can pull the most weight for a short distance.

There are different weight classes and strict rules to avoid animal cruelty.  

Draft breeds are commonly used, but here are also competitions for ponies, where they pull significant weight relative to their size, but usually for shorter distances than full-sized horses.  

Related sports are tractor pulling and  Canine Weight pulling. However, horses pull less weight than tractors, but much more than dogs.

History

The sport of horse pulling originated when horses were still used for daily farm work.  Farmers would challenge one another to see whose horse or team could pull the most weight.  Since then, horse pulling has evolved into an organized sport with teams of equine athletes.
Horses that are used for horse pulling are generally not used for work on the farm. Instead, they are worked regularly to keep their muscles and tendons strong and limber to prevent them from being hurt during competitions.

History of the Dynamometer

The dynamometer was first thought of after the end of World War 1, when farmers were using draft horses as the main power when tending their farms. Professor E. V. Collins, of Iowa State College (now Iowa State University), worked between the years of 1923–1926 to find a way to test the efficiency of plowing horses. He built several machines that were designed to test the pulling power of horses in different soil conditions.

One machine that was created was called the Dynamometer. This machine was specially created to test the maximum pulling power of teams of horses. Arrangements were made for horse pulling competitions to be held at fairs and horse shows. The dynamometer has changeable weights that are set on a vertical track. When a teams of horses were hooked to the machine, they would pull and the weights would move according to the strength of the team.  There are several types of dynamometers including the Hensley-Humbert, Lance, Midwest, New York, Reed, Smith, and Tostenson.

Competitions

A starting load of 1500 pounds is set into the dynamometer, a weight that most teams are expected to be able to pull. Each team entered in the competition is hitched to the machine and they would pull it for a short distance. If the team can not pull the weight, they are removed from the competition and those that successfully pulled the weight continue on to the next round. The competition continues on in this way until only one team of horses remains.

Rules and regulations
Rules and regulations are in place to protect the safety of the horses during competitions. The Eastern Draft Horse Association, being the largest horse pulling organization in the United States, works to ensure safety during competitions by enforcing rules and regulations. Each competition has its own rules in addition to the Eastern Draft Horse Associations rules.

References

External links

 https://web.archive.org/web/20101017023913/http://www.davidhorne-gripmaster.com/historyarticles5.html

Equestrian sports